This article contains the results of the Tipperary county hurling team in the Championship during the 2000s.

Tipperary played 48 Championship games during the decade, winning 28, losing 16 and drawing 4. They won 3 Munster titles in 2001, 2008, and 2009 and won 1 All Ireland title in 2001.

2000

2001

2002

2003

2004

2005

2006

2007

2008

2009

References

External links
Tipperary GAA Fan site
Tipperary on Hoganstand.com
Tipperary GAA site
Premierview
Tipperary GAA Archives

2000 in hurling
2001 in hurling
2002 in hurling
2003 in hurling
2004 in hurling
2005 in hurling
2006 in hurling
2007 in hurling
2008 in hurling
2009 in hurling
0